CCGS Cape Hearne  is one of the Canadian Coast Guard's 36 s.
She as christened in 2005, at the Canadian Coast Guard station at Kingston, Ontario. According to Peter Milliken, the local member of Parliament: "Kingston, with its long-standing history with fishing, maritime trade and recreational boating fully understands the clear need for search and rescue capacity on our Great Lakes. Assigning these new state-of-the-art lifeboats to coastal communities demonstrates the federal commitment to providing the highest levels of safety to ensure the ongoing prosperity and enjoyment of our aquatic riches."

On March 27, 2012, Cape Hearne and Canadian and American helicopters and aircraft were deployed to help rescue the crew of the tugboat , which was disabled due to a fire in her engine room.

Cape Hearne is near the mouth of the Coppermine River, on the Arctic Ocean, and is named after Samuel Hearne the first European to map the Coppermine River.

Design
It contains two computer-operated Detroit DDEC-III 6V-92TA diesel engines providing a combined . It has two  four-blade propellers, and its complement is four crew members and five passengers.

Communication options include Raytheon 152 HF-SSB and Motorola Spectra 9000 VHF50W radios, and a Raytheon RAY 430 loudhailer system. The boat also supports the Simrad TD-L1550 VHF-FM radio direction finder. Raytheon provides a number of other electronic systems for the lifeboat, including the RAYCHART 620, the ST 30 heading indicator and ST 50 depth indicator, the NAV 398 global positioning system, a RAYPILOT 650 autopilot system, and either the R41X AN or SPS-69 radar systems.

References

Cape-class motor lifeboats
2008 ships
Ships built in British Columbia
Ships of the Canadian Coast Guard